The 1976 BC Lions finished in fourth place in the Western Conference with a 5–9–2 record and failed to make the playoffs.

The Lions platooned quarterbacks in 1976 in order to find the replacement for Don Moorhead who had 3 knee surgeries in two years and retired in July.  These quarterbacks included journeymen Eric Guthrie, Rick Cassata, and UCLA star John Sciarra. However, the result was the Lions had by far the league's worst passing attack with only 2476 yards in passing offence and 46% completion percentage.

After only one win in the final 10 games, head coach Cal Murphy was fired in December after 18 months as head coach and a 10–14–2 record.

Defensive End Bill Baker won the Schenley award for Most Outstanding Defensive Player and rookie John Sciarra (who was converted from quarterback to slotback early in the season and was the Lions top receiver) won the Schenley Rookie award with 563 yards receiving.

Centre Al Wilson and Baker made the CFL All-star team for the second consecutive season.

Uniform changes included new orange-coloured facemask (the Lions were the first CFL team to introduce a coloured facemask, two years after the Kansas City Chiefs and then-San Diego Chargers did the same in the NFL), a double orange helmet stripe and new trimmed numbers to complete the look that most fans remember from the 1970s

Harry Spring is elected to the Canadian Football Hall of Fame in the Builder category.

Offseason

CFL Draft

Preseason

Regular season

Season standings

Season schedule

Offensive leaders

Awards and records
CFL's Most Outstanding Defensive Player Award – Bill Baker (DE)

1976 CFL All-Stars
C – Al Wilson, CFL All-Star
DE – Bill Baker, CFL All-Star

References

BC Lions seasons
BC Lions
1976 Canadian Football League season by team